is a 1970 Japanese documentary film by director Shōhei Imamura.

Synopsis
Director Shōhei Imamura interviews Emiko Akuza, the bar hostess of the film's title, who reflects on her life as a prostitute and madam in post-war Yokosuka and comments on news reel footage of Japan's history from 1945 to the present.

Production
After the poor box-office performance of his ambitious 1968 film, The Profound Desire of the Gods, Imamura decided to undertake a more modestly budgeted film. Characteristically, Imamura seeks to investigate an alternative interpretation of recent Japanese history through the eyes of a person living in the lower strata of that society.

Beginning with this film, Imamura was to spend the next decade working in the documentary format. He returned to purely fictional narrative with Vengeance is Mine (1979).

Release
History of Postwar Japan as Told by a Bar Hostess was released in Japan 3 June 1970 where it was distributed by Toho. The film was shown in Los Angeles in 1998 with any earlier American release being undetermined.

References

External links 
 
 

1970 films
1970 documentary films
Japanese documentary films
Films directed by Shohei Imamura
1970s Japanese films